The Fujifilm X-mount is a type of interchangeable lens mount designed by Fujifilm for use in those cameras in their X-series line that have interchangeable-lenses. These lenses are designed for 23.6mm x 15.6mm APS-C sensors.

Various lens manufacturers use this mount, such as Fujifilm's own XF and XC lenses, Carl Zeiss AG (Touit lenses), Samyang Optics, Handevision, SLR Magic, Viltrox and Zhongyi Optics. Additionally, a host of adapters for a range of SLR lenses are available, allowing the mounting of lenses (without autofocus or auto aperture) from Canon, Nikon, Pentax, Minolta, Contax/Yashica, Konica and more. This mount type should not be confused with the discontinued Fujica X-mount, which is not compatible with the newer X-mount without an adapter.

Fujifilm X-Mount cameras

Fujifilm has released the following cameras that use the X-mount:

Fujifilm X-A1
Fujifilm X-A2
Fujifilm X-A3
Fujifilm X-A5
Fujifilm X-A7
Fujifilm X-A10
Fujifilm X-A20
Fujifilm X-E1
Fujifilm X-E2
Fujifilm X-E2s
Fujifilm X-E3
Fujifilm X-E4
Fujifilm X-H1
Fujifilm X-H2
Fujifilm X-H2S
Fujifilm X-M1
Fujifilm X-Pro1
Fujifilm X-Pro2
Fujifilm X-Pro3
Fujifilm X-T1
Fujifilm X-T2
Fujifilm X-T3
Fujifilm X-T4
Fujifilm X-T10
Fujifilm X-T20
Fujifilm X-T30
Fujifilm X-T100
Fujifilm X-T200
Fujifilm X-S10
Fujifilm X-T30 II

Fujinon XF and XC lenses
The following lenses are natively operational on the Fujifilm X-mount cameras. Fujifilm's 'XF' and 'XC' lenses bear Fujifilm's moniker "Fujinon" which is used for optics within the company.

XC prime lenses
Fujinon XC 35mm f/2: A compact and lightweight prime lens with a quick and near silent autofocus. Announced January 23, 2020

XC zoom lenses
These are entry level zoom lenses with smaller maximum aperture and plastic bodies.
 Fujinon XC 15-45mm f/3.5-5.6 OIS PZ: This is a lightweight, collapsible, consumer-grade power zoom lens with a short 13 cm close focusing distance. It is the kit lens for the X-A5 and X-T100, as well as their respective successors, the X-A7 and the X-T200.
 Fujinon XC 16-50mm f/3.5-5.6 OIS: This lens is a consumer-grade standard zoom, covering wide angle to short telephoto, equivalent to 24–76 mm on a full frame camera.  The lens is the 'kit' lens for the X-M1 camera, and has a lower end build quality than the other Fujinon lenses, while maintaining good optical quality.  This lens is the first lens in the new 'XC' line and does not have an aperture ring. Officially announced on June 24, 2013.
 Fujinon XC 16-50mm f/3.5-5.6 OIS II: Has a shorter 15 cm macro focusing distance than the original XC 16-50mm zoom's 30 cm. Delivered in 2015.
 Fujinon XC 50-230mm f/4.5-6.7 OIS: This is a consumer-grade telephoto zoom with optical stabilization and a relatively slow aperture.
 Fujinon XC 50-230mm f/4.5-6.7 OIS II: Improved optical stabilization.

XF Compact / standard prime lenses
 Fujinon XF 14mm f/2.8 R: This ultra-wide angle lens has a focus-clutch mechanism for switching to manual focus. The lens was announced in September, 2012.
 Fujinon XF 18mm f/2.0 R: A wide-angle pancake style lens and one of the original three lenses for the X system.
 Fujinon XF 27mm f/2.8:  This is a wide standard lens with a very slim pancake design. This lens does not have an aperture ring like most lenses in the Fujinon lineup. The lens was officially announced on June 24, 2013.

XF Fast prime lenses

These lenses are those with maximum apertures of f/2 or larger.
 Fujinon XF 16mm f/1.4 R WR: Fast aperture, wide angle lens with a weather-resistant structure. Announced April 2015.
 Fujinon XF 18mm f/1.4 R LM WR: Fast aperture, wide angle lens with a linear motor for fast focus and weather-resistant seals. Equivalent to 28 mm full-frame.
 Fujinon XF 23mm f/1.4 R: This is a fast moderate wide angle lens, equivalent to a 35 mm lens in field of view on a full-frame camera.
 Fujinon XF 23mm f/2 R WR: This is a fast moderate wide angle lens, equivalent to a 35 mm lens in field of view on a full-frame camera. Compared to original 23mm f/1.4 features improved autofocus speeds and weather resistance.
 Fujinon XF 35mm f/1.4 R: A fast normal prime lens.  One of the original three lenses for the X system.  Released in 2011, the prime 35mm f/1.4 (52.5mm equivalent) lens has no image stabilisation and is not weather resistance in comparison to the newer 35mm f/2 lens.
 Fujinon XF 35mm f/2 R WR: A fast normal prime lens. Compared to original 35mm f/1.4 features improved autofocus speeds and weather resistance.
Fujinon XF 50mm f/1.0 R WR: The fastest autofocus lens by Fujifilm. Announced September 3, 2020.
 Fujinon XF 50mm f/2 R WR: A fast mid-telephoto lens suitable for portraiture.  Part of Fujifilm's lineup of compact and lightweight lenses which include the XF 23mmF2 and XF 35mmF2.
 Fujinon XF 56mm f/1.2 R: This is a standard portrait length lens, with a field of view similar to an 85 mm lens on a full frame camera with an f/1.2 aperture. Officially announced on January 6, 2014.
 Fujinon XF 56mm f/1.2 R APD: Similar to the earlier 56 mm f/1.2 R, but adds an apodizing filter to optimize bokeh for portrait shooting. Officially announced on September 10, 2014.
 Fujinon XF 90mm f/2 R LM WR: A longer focal length portrait lens. The first lens to use Quad Linear Motor autofocus, plus the lens is also weather-resistant. Officially announced on May 18, 2015.
 Fujinon XF 200mm f/2 R LM OIS WR

XF macro lenses
 Fujinon XF 30mm f/2.8 R LM WR Macro: A light and compact 1:1 Macro lens. Officially announced in November 2022.
 Fujinon XF 60mm f/2.4 R Macro: Short telephoto lens suitable for portraiture.  Focuses close to allow 1:2 magnification macro shooting.  One of the original three lenses for the X system.
 Fujinon XF 80mm f/2.8 R LM OIS WR Macro: A telephoto 1:1 Macro lens.  First prime lens in the XF line to use OIS.  Officially announced on September 7, 2017.

XF zoom lenses
 Fujinon XF 10-24mm f/4 R OIS: An ultra-wide angle zoom lens with image stabilization. Officially announced on December 18, 2013.
 Fujinon XF 10-24mm f/4 R OIS WR: A weather-resistant, ultra-wide angle zoom lens with image stabilization. Officially announced on October 15, 2020.
 Fujinon XF 18-55mm f/2.8-4 R LM OIS: The first zoom lens for the X-mount, this lens has a wide angle to short telephoto zoom range, with a fast maximum aperture and optical image stabilization.
 Fujinon XF 18-120mm f/4 LM PZ WR: A weather-resistant, powered superzoom,optimized for video.
 Fujinon XF 18-135mm f/3.5–5.6 R LM OIS WR: A weather-resistant, image-stabilized superzoom, covering focal lengths equivalent to 27–202.5 mm on full-frame. Officially announced on June 16, 2014.
 Fujinon XF 55-200mm f/3.5-4.8 R LM OIS: A telephoto zoom lens with fast maximum aperture. Officially announced on April 17, 2013.
 Fujinon XF 70-300mm f/4-5.6 R LM OIS WR: A weather-resistant telephoto zoom with image stabilization, covering focal lengths equivalent to 107–457 mm on full-frame. Officially announced on January 27, 2021.

XF "Red Badge" high-end zoom lenses
 Fujinon XF 8-16mm f/2.8 R LM WR: released in November 2018.
 Fujinon XF 16-55mm f/2.8 R LM WR: An enthusiast-level standard zoom, covering focal lengths equivalent to 24–82.5 mm on full-frame, with weather-resistant construction.  Officially announced on January 6, 2015, during CES 2015.
 Fujinon XF 50-140mm f/2.8 R LM OIS WR: A weather-resistant telephoto zoom with image stabilization, covering focal lengths equivalent to 75–210 mm on full-frame.  Officially announced on September 10, 2014.
 Fujinon XF 100-400mm f/4.5-5.6 R LM OIS WR: A weather-resistant telephoto zoom with image stabilization, covering focal lengths equivalent to 150–600 mm on full-frame.

Fujinon line-up specification comparison

Short back focusing distance
By reducing the distance between the rear lens element and the sensor, a more compact construction is possible.

XF18mm / Back focus distance: 11.0 mm
XF35mm / Back focus distance: 21.9 mm
XF60mm / Back focus distance: 21.0 mm

Third Party Lenses
Until 2018, all third party lenses were  manual except from the three Zeiss Touit lenses. In 2019, Viltrox introduced a 85 mm f/1.8 AF lens lacking an aperture ring. In April 2020, the same company introduced a 33 mm f/1.4 lens with an aperture ring. Two more Viltrox lenses, 23 mm f/1.4 and 56 mm f/1.4, are announced for 2020. On March 6, 2020, Tokina announced three atx-m autofocus lenses for Fujifilm X-mount to be introduced in autumn 2020. Toshihisa Iida, the General Manager of Fujifilm's Optical Device and Electronic Imaging Products Division, explained on April 14, 2020, that Fuji followed plans on opening the X-mount up to third-party lens manufacturers. The manufacturer Kenko Tokina was mentioned in this interview.

Autofocus lenses

Carl Zeiss lenses
The Touit line of compact lenses from Carl Zeiss AG is purposely designed for APS-C like camera bodies. The optics of these lenses are designed by Carl Zeiss, but the design for manufacturing is done by the Japanese manufacturer Cosina. The Touit lenses are produced for a Fujifilm X-mount and Sony E-mount. Because Fujifilm did not share the specifications of the X-mount, Carl Zeiss never received officially the license for releasing X-mount lenses. The Touit lenses are therefore non-certified.

 Carl Zeiss Touit Distagon 12mm f/2.8 wide angle lens
 Carl Zeiss Touit Planar 32mm f/1.8 normal lens
 Carl Zeiss Touit Macro Planar 50mm f/2.8 macro lens

Sigma Lenses (as of November 2022) 
Sigma has announced on Feb. 2022 the release of three new F1.4 prime lenses for Fujifilm X-mount camera systems. They are nearly identical to their predecessors, which were previously released for Canon EF-M mount, L-mount, Micro Four Thirds and Sony E-mount cameras.

 Sigma 16mm f/1.4 DC DN Contemporary
 Sigma 30mm f/1.4 DC DN Contemporary
 Sigma 56mm f/1.4 DC DN Contemporary
 Sigma 18-50mm f/2.8 DC DN Contemporary

Tokina lenses (as of April 2020)
Announced March 2020 with a release date of autumn 2020.

 Tokina atx-m 23mm f/1.4
 Tokina atx-m 33mm f/1.4
 Tokina atx-m 56mm f/1.4

Viltrox lenses (as of September 2022)
 PFU RBMH 85 mm f/1.8 STM ED IF. This lens was introduced in October 2018. It supports autofocus and EXIF data transfer as well as camera-based aperture selection.
 AF 85 mm f/1.8 STM ED IF Mark II (introduced in July 2020)
 AF 23 mm f/1.4 STM ED IF (introduced in 2020)
 AF 33mm f/1.4 STM ED IF (introduced on April 15, 2020)
 AF 56 mm f/1.4 (introduced in September 2020)
AF 13mm f1.4 (introduced in February 2022)

Tamron lenses (as of sept. 2021)
 18-300mm F/3.5-6.3 Di III-A VC VXD (Model B061), introduced on August 26, 2021
11-20mm f/2.8 (announced)
17-70mm F/2.8 Di III-A VC RXD (Model B070), introduced on July 8, 2022

Manual lenses

Manual lenses usually provide no Exif data transfer, no autofocus, no automatic aperture control, and no lens-based image stabilizer.

7artisans lenses (as of August 2019)

Shenzhen 7artisans Photoelectric Technology Co., Ltd.

 7.5 mm f/2.8 fisheye lens
 12 mm f/2.8
 25 mm f/1.8
 35 mm f/0.95 (similar to Risespray)
 35 mm f/1.2
 35 mm f/2.0
 50 mm f/1.8
 55 mm f/1.4
 60 mm f/2.8 macro lens

B.I.G. ultra macro lens (as of August 2019)

B.I.G. Brenner Import- & Großhandels GmbH

B.I.G. Helioret 50 mm f/4.5 M39 macro head in combination with B.I.G. Makroschnecke for Fuji X.

HandeVision / Kipon lens (as of August 2019)
 HVIB4085FX IBELUX 40 mm f/0.85 High-Speed.

KamLan lenses (as of July 2020)
 KamLan 8 mm f/3.0 Fisheye
 KamLan 15 mm f/2.0 APS-C
 KamLan 21 mm f/1.8
 KamLan 28 mm f/1.4
 KamLan 50 mm f/1.1
 KamLan 50 mm f/1.1 Mark 2

Lensbaby lenses
 Velvet 56 f/1.6 macro 1:2
 Velvet 85 f/1.8 macro 1:2
 Burnside 35 f/2.8
 Composer Pro II with Edge 50 f/3.2
 Composer Pro II with Sweet 35 f/2.5
 Composer Pro II with Sweet 50 f/2.5
 Composer Pro II with Sweet 80 f/2.8
 Trio 28 with Filter Kit (28mm f/3.5)
 Circular Fisheye 12mm f/4
 Creative Bokeh Optic 50mm f/2.5

Meike lenses (as of August 2019)

Hongkong Meike Digital Technology Co., Ltd.

 6-11 mm f/3.5 fisheye
 6.5 mm f/2.0 fisheye
 8 mm f/3.5 fisheye
 12 mm f/2.8
 25mm T/2.2 cine lens
 25 mm f/2.0
 28 mm f/2.8
 35 mm f/1.4
 35 mm f/1.7
 50 mm f/2.0

Pergear lenses (as of September 2020)

 25 mm f/1.8
 35 mm f/1.6
 50 mm f/1.8
 7.5 mm f/2.8
 35 mm f/1.2
 12 mm f/2.0

SainSonic lens (as of July 2020)
 Zonlai 22 mm f/1.8

Samyang lenses
Lenses are sold under the interchangeable Samyang, Rokinon, Walimex, and Bower brand names.
 8 mm f/2.8 UMC Fisheye
 8 mm F2.8 UMC Fisheye II (black and silver versions)
 8 mm T3.1 UMC Cine Fisheye II
 10 mm f/2.8 ED AS NCS CS Ultra Wide Angle
 12 mm f/2.0 NCS CS Ultra Wide Angle (black and silver versions)
 12 mm T2.2 VDSLR NCS CS (cine version of the above 12 mm f/2.0 NCS CS Ultra Wide Angle)
 14 mm f/2.8 FE14M-FX Ultra Wide Lens
 16 mm T/2.0 Aspherical Wide Angle
 20 mm f/1.8 ED AS UMC
 35 mm f/1.2 ED AS UMC CS
 50 mm T1.5 AS UMC VDSLR Cine
 85 mm f/1.4 AS IF UMC
 100 mm f/2.8 1:1 Macro IF HR ED UMC
 300 mm f/6.3 ED UMC CS Reflex Mirror

Sirui lens (as of July 2020)
 50 mm f/1.8 anamorphic cine Lens

SLR Magic lenses
 SLR Magic 35 mm T1.4 Cine Mark II Lens
 SLR Magic 23 mm f/1.7 Hyperprime Lens
 SLR Magic 35 mm T0.95 Hyperprime Cine II Lens
 SLR Magic 50 mm f/0.95 Hyperprime Lens

Venus Optics lenses (as of July 2020)

 Laowa 9 mm f/2.8 Zero-D (zero distortion).
 Laowa 9 mm t/2.9 Zero-D Cine (Cine lens)
 Laowa 65 mm f/2.8 APO 2:1 ultra macro

Voigtländer lenses

Voigtländer lenses provide Exif data transfer, automatic focus magnification, distance scale and image stabilization information, and parallax compensation for supported X-mount cameras.

 35mm f/1.2 Nokton X

Voking by Bilora lenses (as of August 2019)

BILORA GmbH

 28 mm f/2.8 pancake
 35 mm f/1.7
 50 mm f/2.0

William Optics lens (as of July 2020)
 RedCat 51 APO 250 mm f/4.9

Zhongyi Optics (Shenyang Zhongyi Optics) lenses

Zhongyi Optics lenses are sold under the "Mitakon" brand.

 Mitakon Creator 20 mm f/2 ultra macro lens
 Mitakon Speedmaster 35 mm Mark II f/0.95
 Announced: Mitakon 24 mm F/1.7

Pinhole lenses

Skink lenses (as of July 2020)
 Pinhole Pancake Fujifilm FX 15 mm
 Pinhole Pancake Fujifilm FX 18 mm
 Pinhole Pancake Fujifilm FX 24 mm

Thingyfy lenses (as of July 2020)
 Thingyfy Pinhole Pro S11; 11 mm
 Thingyfy Pinhole Pro; 26 mm

Third Party X mount lenses comparison

Bayonet adaptors (August 2019)

Full frame Lenses with various bayonets can be mounted to Fuji X-mount bodies with suitable adaptors. A multitude of adaptors are available from brands like E&F Concept, Fringer, Kipon, Mitakon Zhongyi, Novoflex, Viltrox.

Beyond multiple passive adaptors (manual operation only, no EXIF data transfer), there are active ones available to mount Canon EF lens mount lenses to Fuji X-mount.
 Fringer EF-FX and EF-FX Pro II
 Viltrox EF-FX1

See also
 Fujica X-mount

References

External links

 Official Fujifilm X-Pro1 product page

Lens mounts
Fujifilm X-mount cameras